State Road 347 (NM 347) is a partially completed road that starts at Interstate 40 on the West Mesa, approximately  west of downtown Albuquerque. It runs north-northeast, following Paseo del Volcan to its northern terminus at US-550 in Bernalillo. The  northern section begins at Unser Boulevard in Rio Rancho and ends at US-550 in Bernalillo, which incorporates a 3.4 mile extension of Paseo del Volcan from Iris Road to US-550 that was completed in February 2011. The remaining  segment from Paseo del Norte to Unser Boulevard is not yet built. While the New Mexico Department of Transportation owns the right-of-way for the unbuilt section, its completion is contingent upon future growth within Albuquerque and Rio Rancho and the availability of funding.

Currently a 2-lane road, NM 347 right-of-way is 150 feet wide to accommodate expansion to a freeway, should future growth and traffic demand necessitate the construction of a freeway along the Paseo del Volcan corridor.

History
An environmental impact statement for the Paseo del Volcan project was approved in August 2001 by the Federal Highway Administration (FHWA). Phase 1 of the project, a  segment between Unser Blvd. and Iris Road was completed in October 2006. The road was designated as State Road 347 between I-40 and US 550 in August 2010. The Phase 2 extension  eastward to US 550 was opened to traffic in February 2011. Land acquisition is currently in progress for a further extension westward from Unser Blvd. to Rainbow Blvd. In July 2011, a street west of Albuquerque also known as Paseo del Volcan was renamed Atrisco Vista Blvd. to avoid a naming conflict. Interchange construction at I-40 will be Phase 3 of the project and awaits acquisition of individual private parcels along the Interstate.

Long-range planning anticipates the roadway requiring four to five additional lanes by 2035. Extending the road to  I-25 and even eventually linking the road to I-25 both to the north and south creating a western bypass in metropolitan Albuquerque are also under consideration.

Major intersections
The following only represents the roadway as completed and open to traffic.

See also

References

External links

347
Transportation in Bernalillo County, New Mexico
Transportation in Sandoval County, New Mexico